Rengo may refer to:

 Rengo, a city in Chile, located in the O'Higgins Region
 RENGO, an umbrella organization that represents the interests of union members in Japan
 Rengo (board game), a four-player variant of the board game Go
 Rengo Co., Ltd., a Japanese enterprise
 Renko (previously known as "Rengo"), a former municipality of Finland